Hobo Bobo is a 1947 Warner Bros. Merrie Melodies cartoon short directed by Robert McKimson. The short was released on May 17, 1947.

The cartoon stars Robert C. Bruce as the narrator, as well as the voices of Mel Blanc and Stan Freberg.

Plot
Bobo, a baby Indian elephant, sees a dark future for himself if he should remain in India to haul logs with his trunk for the rest of his life. After receiving a letter from his uncle in America, he decides to emigrate there to play on a circus baseball team. After Bobo's attempts to stow away aboard a ship bound for the United States fail repeatedly, he is advised by the mynah bird (better known from the Inki series) to paint himself pink. As seeing pink elephants is the traditional hallucination of the drunkard, neither the captain, the crew nor the passengers will acknowledge seeing Bobo, and thus he has the virtual run of the ship for the entire voyage.

When Bobo finally disembarks in New York City, he is likewise unacknowledged, until a street-cleaning vehicle washes his pink paint off, and the populace panics at the sight of a normal gray baby elephant on the street. The police end up arresting Bobo.

Hauled into court by the police, the judge sentences him to life....at the circus. At the circus, Bobo is promptly engaged by the baseball team as the official batboy. Bobo angrily utters his only line in the film "Batboy, shmatboy! I'm still carrying logs!"

Later appearance
Bobo would appear again as a baseball mascot in Gone Batty, which was also directed by McKimson, and originally released in 1954, and re-released as a Merrie Melodies Blue Ribbon classic in 1963.

References

External links

1947 animated films
1947 short films
1947 films
Merrie Melodies short films
Films directed by Robert McKimson
Animated films about elephants
1940s Warner Bros. animated short films
Films about immigration to the United States
Films set in India
Animated films set in New York City
Circus films
American baseball films